Hannaford is a rural locality in the Western Downs Region, Queensland, Australia. In the  Hannaford had a population of 118 people.

Geography 

Hannaford is flat land used for agriculture. The Surat Developmental Road passes through the locality from east to west. The Glenmorgan railway line also passes through the locality from east (The Gums) to west (Meandarra); Hannaford railway station serves the locality.

History 
Hannaford railway station was named on 14 July 1924 by the Queensland Railways Department taking the name of the parish, which in turn was named after pastoralist Samuel Hannaford, who leased the North Inglestone pastoral run.

Hannaford Provisional School opened on 4 March 1929 but closed on 29 August 1930. It reopened on 17 March 1947 and became Hannaford State School in 1948.

Hannaford Post Office opened around 1934. It remains open as a community postal agent.

In the  Hannaford had a population of 118 people.

Education 
Hannaford State School is a government primary (Prep-6) school for boys and girls at Hannaford Road. In 2015, the school had an enrolment of 9 students with 2 teachers (1 full-time equivalent) and 4 non-teaching staff (2 full-time equivalent). In 2018, the school had an enrolment of 23 students with 3 teachers (2 full-time equivalent) and 5 non-teaching staff (2 full-time equivalent).

There is no secondary school in Hannaford. The nearest secondary school is Tara Shire State College in Tara to the east, but it is a considerable distance for a daily commute and other options would be distance education or boarding school.

References

External links 

Western Downs Region
Localities in Queensland